American Cyanamid Company was a leading American conglomerate which became one of the nation's top 100 manufacturing companies during the 1970s and 1980s, according to the Fortune 500 listings at the time. It started in fertilizer, but added many other lines of business. It merged with American Home Products in 1994. The combined company sold off most of its lines of business except pharmaceuticals, adopted the name of its remaining Wyeth division, and was bought by Pfizer in 2009, becoming defunct as a separate concern.

History 
The company was founded by engineers Frank S. Washburn and Charles H. Baker in New York City in 1907, to capitalize on a German patent they had licensed for the manufacture of nitrogen products for fertilizer. The company's name is derived from the chemical calcium cyanamide, the fertilizer they would manufacture. They soon set up headquarters in Nashville, investing a million dollars in several corporations underpinning the manufacturing operation to be set up in nearby Muscle Shoals, Alabama (sometimes called Mussel Shoals), 120 miles from Nashville, on the Tennessee River. These planned operations included an electric power generating company (Mussel Shoals Hydro-electric) a utility company to distribute the electricity that would power the chemical plant, and the Cyanamid manufacturing plant. Washburn was President and located in Nashville, while Baker was Vice President and remained in New York. Cynamide plants were also planned for Niagara Falls, Ontario and Georgia. By 1908 the company was incorporated in Maine. The Canadian plant was the first in operation in 1910, and was to be followed by the Alabama plant.

However, the development of United States manufacturing was suspended when they were denied the construction of a dam for the hydroelectric generation station. Instead, United States offices of the company imported product from its Canadian plant. The company abandoned its Nashville headquarters in 1915 and relocated them to New York City. At the same time, it was trying to raise political support, both grass-roots and via lobbying, to implement the Alabama power generation plan, and as it began to face competition for the American market.

In 1917, Cyanamid purchased the Ammo-Phosphate Corporation, which owned a fertilizer plant in Linden, New Jersey manufacturing ammonium phosphate.

During World War I, the company shifted its nitrogen production from fertilizer to explosives. With offers of free use of patents and processes, along with personnel and equipment, it enticed the United States government to approve and pay for its original plans for the Alabama plant, with some modifications, to help with the war effort. A separate company, the Air Nitrates Corporation, was set up for this government contract to build and operate the plant for the duration of the war, with Cyanamid earning some fees and to later inherit the plant for the fertilizer business. This raised concerns of cronyism, but the critics were outnumbered by local supporters in Congress. However, when the war ended, the first stage of the plant had only just begun limited production. A few months later, the Justice Department began an investigation into the contract and possible graft.

Washburn died October 9, 1922. At the time, the government still owned the Muscle Shoals plants. A year later, a number of interests were competing to buy or lease it, including Air Nitrates/American Cynamid, General Electric, and Henry Ford. However by 1926, the list of bidders was far different as the Senate debated the merits of Air Nitrates in a joint venture with Union Carbide, the local power companies (who were most interested in the generating station), and a New York financial consortium. In the end, after much lobbying and debate, none of the bids were accepted. The government elected to run the plants itself, balancing the regional power requirements against farming needs for inexpensive fertilizer.

The company grew to over 100,000 employees worldwide, and had over 200,000 shareholders by the mid-1970s. Its stock was traded on the New York Stock Exchange under the symbol ACY. It was repeatedly reorganized after the mid-1990s, merged with other firms, and saw brands and divisions sold or spun off. The bulk of the former company is now part of Pfizer, with smaller portions belonging to BASF, Procter & Gamble and other firms.

Product lines 
Although originally a manufacturer of agricultural chemicals, the company broadened its product lines into many types of industrial chemicals and specialty chemicals. The company then diversified into synthetic fibers, pharmaceuticals, surgical products, plastics, and inorganic pigments before World War II; and later added, by acquisitions, cosmetic and toiletry products, perfumes, building products, home building, and several smaller product categories following World War II.

From 1931 to 1943 American Cyanamid produced the pesticide Zyklon B under license.

Cyanamid's pharmaceutical division included "Lederle Laboratories", maker of Piperacillin, an antibiotic drug used as a penicillin substitute; Centrum, a multivitamin supplement; Stresstabs vitamins; and Orimune, an oral polio vaccine. Davis & Geck was the company's medical device operation, organized under Lederle. Its Consumer Products division included "Shulton" products, primarily Old Spice cologne and after-shave lotion, Breck shampoo, and Pine-Sol household cleaner. A variety of fine fragrance products were made and sold by Shulton under license, including products under labels Nina Ricci, Pierre Cardin, Tabac, and others. "Melmac" was Cyanamid's trademark for plastic kitchenware, although it was produced and marketed by other firms under license.

Legal issues 
Cyanamid was involved in the tetracycline litigation.

In its last years, the company was involved in numerous legal issues related to its earlier environmental pollution. During the 1970s, tens of millions of dollars were spent on effluent treatment – such as a $15-million tertiary water treatment plant in Bound Brook, New Jersey, which returned to the Raritan River water that was cleaner than the river itself, due to the river having been directly polluted by American Cyanamid, which had pumped toxic, undiluted liquid waste into the river for decades prior. Tens of millions more were spent in efforts to clean up large wastewater pools which had decades of accumulation of toxic, carcinogenic, and teratogenic chemicals. These are considered by the U.S. Environmental Protection Agency (EPA) to be among the most toxic chemical waste sites in the U.S. Cyanamid merged with American Home Products in 1994, and AHP changed its name to Wyeth which was then purchased by Pfizer in 2009. Responsibility for the clean-up of these sites remained with the site owner during these corporate transitions.  Remediation began at Bound Brook in 2007 and Pfizer took over the site in 2009.

The 575-acre Superfund site at Bound Brook-Bridgewater had a history of flooding. It was flooded in the 1930s and again in August 1971 during Hurricane Doria, at which time the plant sustained major damage to its facilities and equipment. In 2011, during Hurricane Irene the site once again flooded, but by this time all manufacturing had ended and all buildings had been torn down. However, impounds and wastesites remained with consequent leakage of benzene and numerous other chemicals into the Raritan River and adjacent land, apparently including residential sites.  Subsequent testing showed no evident danger to humans, but the calamity intensified the extensive cleanup work already underway and the EPA announced another remediation plan for the site in September 2012.

In the United Kingdom, the company was involved in a well-known legal case, American Cyanamid Co. (No.1) v Ethicon Ltd. (1975), which set the test for awarding an interim injunction in England and Wales and set down what became known to lawyers as the American Cyanamid principles. The American Cyanamid principles are also applied under public procurement law when the high court determines whether to lift the automatic suspension of the power to award a public contract when an application has been made to the court to challenge the lawfulness of a proposed contract award.

Acquisition and breakup 
The company merged with American Home Products (AHP) in 1994. At that time, the purchase price, $9.5 billion, made it the second-largest industrial acquisition in U.S. history to that point. American Home Products eventually changed its name to Wyeth Corporation (one of its subsidiaries), and in 2009 Wyeth merged with Pfizer, becoming a subsidiary of the world's largest pharmaceutical company.

After the AHP acquisition, the Cyanamid conglomerate was disassembled over a period of years.  The Pigments division was sold to National Lead Company.  The Old Spice product line, and some others, were sold to Procter and Gamble. Formica Corporation was taken private in a management buyout, and later went through a series of ownership changes, and is owned by Fletcher Building, headquartered in New Zealand.

The $1.7 billion agricultural business was sold in 2000 to the German chemical giant BASF, raising BASF agricultural sales to $3.6 billion (1999 pro-forma), making it one of the top three agricultural companies in the world.

Most of the chemical businesses of American Cyanamid are operated by a spun-off successor company known as Cytec. Cytec was acquired by Solvay Group in December 2015 to form the Cytec Solvay Group based in Brussels, Belgium.

The American Cyanamid compound in Wayne, New Jersey later served as the headquarters of Toys "R" Us.

See also
 Indiana Harbor Belt Railroad Co. v. American Cyanamid Co.
 List of Superfund sites in New Jersey

General sources

Citations

External links
 Wyeth web site
 BASF - partial acquisition of American Cyanamid in 2000
 United States Court of Appeals for the Fourth Circuit.  N°02-1235. American Cyanamid Company, Plaintiff-Appellee v. St. Louis University, Defendant-Appellant. St. Louis University (SLU) paid a $16 million Missouri state court judgment to the family of a boy who became paralyzed after receiving Orimune, an oral polio vaccine and sought contribution from American Cyanamid Company, the parent company of the vaccine manufacturer.
 Criterion Catalysts & Technologies - introduction to Criterion's catalytic reforming (mentions spin-off from American Cyanamid and the two Shell companies)
 Guide to the American Cyanamid Company Technical Bulletins 1945–1988

1907 establishments in New York (state)
1994 disestablishments in New Jersey
Chemical companies established in 1907
Chemical companies of the United States
Companies based in Passaic County, New Jersey
Defunct manufacturing companies based in New Jersey
Manufacturing companies disestablished in 1994
Pharmaceutical companies based in New Jersey
Pharmaceutical companies disestablished in 1994
Pharmaceutical companies established in 1907
Wyeth